Jawahar Navodaya Vidayalya, Sitapur is one of the approximately 600 Navodaya Vidyalayas in India. It is located in the outskirts of Khairabad town, approximately 8 kilometers from the headquarters of Sitapur District in Uttar Pradesh. It has a campus of about 12 acres.

JNV sitapur Started its First operations from Jail Road Sitapur Campus in 1988 with Mr Yagya Narayan Pathak as its Principal;

Affiliations
JNV Sitapur is affiliated with Central Board for Secondary Education C.B.S.E. The school follows syllabus prescribed by CBSE.

References

External links
 Official website of JNV Sitapur  

Jawahar Navodaya Vidyalayas in Uttar Pradesh
Boarding schools in Uttar Pradesh
Sitapur district
Educational institutions established in 1988
1988 establishments in Uttar Pradesh